Zangi or Zengi may refer to:

People

 Imad al-Din Zengi (1085–1146), Turkish noble
 Zengid dynasty, a Muslim dynasty of Oghuz Turkic origin
 Nur ad-Din (died 1174) (Nūr al-Dīn Maḥmūd Zengī), his second son
 Mohammad Shammaa Al Zengi III (1883–1954), Syrian textile magnate
Akram Shammaa (Akram Shammaa Al Zengi, 1930–2012), his son

Places
 Zangi, Azerbaijan
 Zangi, East Azerbaijan, Iran
 Zangi, Kermanshah, Iran

Other uses
 Zangi, a regional version of the Japanese food karaage

See also